Qeshlaq-e Hajji Hasan may refer to:
 Qeshlaq-e Hajji Hasan, Ardabil
 Qeshlaq-e Hajji Hasan, West Azerbaijan